Controlled demolition refers to:

 Demolition, the tearing-down of buildings and other structures
 Controlled Demolition, Inc., Phoenix, Maryland firm that specializes in the use of explosives to create a controlled demolition of a structure